Lake Iijärvi (Suomussalmi) is a rather small lake of northern Finland. It belongs to the Oulujoki main catchment area. It is situated partly in Kainuu region and partly in Northern Ostrobothnia region. The lake is situated in the border of Hossa Nature Protection Area.

See also
List of lakes in Finland

References

Lakes of Suomussalmi